Josip Špoljarić (born 5 January 1997) is a Croatian professional footballer who plays for Osijek.

Club career
Špoljarić spent his entire youth career in his hometown club NK Osijek. A youth international, he was chosen in the summer of 2014 as the best player of the Croatian U-17 football league. He debuted for the first team on 11 August 2014, aged 17, in the 2–1 away loss against HNK Hajduk Split, and scored his first senior goal against the same opponent in the 3–2 home loss on 9 May 2015.

On 28 July 2021, Špoljarić joined Zalaegerszeg in Hungary on a season-long loan.

References

External links
 
 

1997 births
Living people
Sportspeople from Osijek
Association football defenders
Croatian footballers
Croatia youth international footballers
NK Osijek players
NK Dugopolje players
Santarcangelo Calcio players
NK Istra 1961 players
Zalaegerszegi TE players
Croatian Football League players
First Football League (Croatia) players
Serie C players
Nemzeti Bajnokság I players
Croatian expatriate footballers
Croatian expatriate sportspeople in Italy
Expatriate footballers in Italy
Croatian expatriate sportspeople in Hungary
Expatriate footballers in Hungary